Dipeptidyl-peptidase 2 is an enzyme that in humans is encoded by the DPP7 gene.

The protein encoded by this gene is a post-proline cleaving aminopeptidase expressed in quiescent lymphocytes. The resting lymphocytes are maintained through suppression of apoptosis, a state which is disrupted by inhibition of this novel serine protease. The enzyme has strong sequence homology with prolyl carboxypeptidase and is active at both acidic and neutral pH.

References

Further reading